Chloe Pearse (born 3 March 1994) is an Irish rugby player from Limerick. She plays for UL Bohemians, Munster Rugby and the Ireland women's national rugby union team.

Club career 
Pearse started rugby as 13-year-old at St Mary's RFC in Limerick. Her first senior club was Shannon RFC and she moved to All-Ireland League side UL Bohemians to fulfill her ambition of lining out for Munster Rugby and she was their co-captain in 2020.

Pearse, whose position has varied from back-row to prop forward, was the top try scorer in the 2019–2020 All-Ireland League, scoring 15 tries in 12 games.

In 2021 she was a key figure in Munster winner their first interprovincial title since 2017, scoring three tries versus Ulster and two more in the final against Leinster.

International career 
Pearse made her debut for the Ireland women's national rugby union team, against England, in an Autumn international in 2016 when she replaced the injured Claire Molloy after just 45 minutes. She also played against Canada in that series.

She has been selected to the Ireland XV squad for the Women's Six Nations Championship in 2018, 2020 and 2021 but has not yet made her Six Nations debut.

Pearse lined out for Munster against the first women's Barbarians side in 2017.

Personal life 
Pearse has a Sports and Exercise degree from the University of Limerick where she also qualified with a Masters in Business Management. She works as a business development representative for Uber.

Honours

References

External links 

Living people
1994 births